Nowy Kozłów Pierwszy  is a village in the administrative district of Gmina Nowa Sucha, within Sochaczew County, Masovian Voivodeship, in east-central Poland.

References

Villages in Sochaczew County